Julia Jentsch (born 20 February 1978) is a German actress. She has received awards including the Silver Bear, European Film Award, and Lola. She is best known for Sophie Scholl – The Final Days, The Edukators and I Served the King of England.

Career
Jentsch was born to a family of lawyers in West Berlin and began her actor training in Berlin at the Hochschule Ernst Busch, a drama school. Her first prominent screen role was in the 2004 cult film The Edukators, starring opposite Daniel Brühl.

Jentsch garnered further attention playing Sophie Scholl in the 2005 film Sophie Scholl – The Final Days, which was nominated for an Academy Award for Best Foreign Language Film. In an interview, Jentsch said that playing the role was "an honour." She won Best Actress at the European Film Awards, at the German Film Awards (a.k.a. Lolas) and a Silver Bear at the Berlin Film Festival for her role as Sophie Scholl.

She was decorated with the Cross of the Order of Merit of the Federal Republic of Germany.

Personal life
Jentsch has been married to the freelance Swiss artist and personality trainer Christian Hablützel since 2012. They have a daughter and live near Zurich.

Selected filmography

Angry Kisses (2000) - Katrin
Julietta (2001) - Nicole
Getting My Brother Laid, a.k.a. My Brother the Vampire (2001) - Nadine
Tatort (TV) (2004) - Johanna Kemmerlang
The Edukators (2004) - Jule
Downfall, a.k.a. Der Untergang (2004) - Hanna Potrowski
Schneeland (2005) - Ina
Sophie Scholl – The Final Days (2005) - Sophie Scholl
 (TV) (2006) - Sarah Maisel
I Served the King of England (2006) - Líza
 (TV) (2007) - Angelina 'Gina' Franke
33 Scenes From Life (2008) - Julia Szczesna
Effi Briest (2009) - Effi von Briest
 (2009) - Kathrin
 (2010) - 'Vicky' Viktualia Veloso
Chalet Girl (2011) - The Race Starter (uncredited)
Hut in the Woods (2011) - Petra
Hannah Arendt (2012) - Lotte Köhler
The Strange Case of Wilhelm Reich (2012) - Eva Reich
Kokowääh 2 (2013) - Nicks Mutter
Sovsem ne prostaya istoriya (2013)
The Chosen Ones (2014) - Petra Grust
 (2015) - Lena
All of a Sudden (2016) - Laura
24 Weeks (2016) - Astrid
 (2016) - Isabelle
Der Pass (a.k.a. Pagan Peak, 2019) - Ellie Stocker
Lindenberg! Mach dein Ding (2020) - Hermine Lindenberg

Awards

2004 Bavarian Film Award for Best New Actress.
2005 Film Award in Gold at the German Film Awards as Best Actress for portraying the role of Sophie Scholl.
2005 European Film Awards for Best Actress for the film Sophie Scholl – The Final Days.
Best Actress for the film Sophie Scholl – The Final Days at the 55th Berlin International Film Festival (2005).
2018 Bavarian TV Awards for Best actress for her role in Das Verschicken

References

External links

Julia Jentsch fansite 

1978 births
Living people
20th-century German actresses
21st-century German actresses
Actresses from Berlin
German film actresses
German stage actresses
German television actresses
European Film Award for Best Actress winners
Best Actress German Film Award winners
Silver Bear for Best Actress winners
Recipients of the Cross of the Order of Merit of the Federal Republic of Germany
Ernst Busch Academy of Dramatic Arts alumni
People from Berlin